AKT InMotion is a New York City-based fitness company founded by fitness expert Anna Kaiser. Founded in 2013, the AKT program consists of a mixture of circuit training, HIIT, strength, toning, dance cardio, Pilates and yoga.

Services and operations 

AKT InMotion offers classes, private training, sessions with a staff nutritionist, Transformation Programs, On Demand streaming, retreats, intensives, pre- and post-natal programs, and a clothing line. Clients can pay for classes by using a drop-in pay method or by buying a membership. In addition, streaming memberships are available for on-the-go workouts, as well as DVDs of classes and a YouTube channel. 

With a flagship location on the Upper East Side, the company has studios in NoMad, Manhattan, Los Angeles, Connecticut, and East Hampton.

Clients 

Clients include celebrities such as Drew Barrymore, Karlie Kloss, and Shakira. Kelly Ripa cites the AKTechnique as her favorite workout.

References

Companies based in New York City